Desulfovibrio halophilus is a halophilic sulfate-reducing bacterium.

References

Further reading
Staley, James T., et al. "Bergey’s manual of systematic bacteriology, vol. 3. "Williams and Wilkins, Baltimore, MD (2012).
Alsharhan, Abdulrahman S., and CHRISTOPHER G. St C. Kendall. "Introduction to Quaternary carbonate and evaporite sedimentary facies and their ancient analogues." Int. Assoc. Sedimentol. Spec. Publ 43 (2011): 1–10.
Barton, Larry L., and W. Allan Hamilton, eds. Sulphate-reducing bacteria: Environmental and engineered systems. Cambridge University Press, 2007.

External links 
LPSN

Type strain of Desulfovibrio halophilus at BacDive -  the Bacterial Diversity Metadatabase

Bacteria described in 1991
Desulfovibrio